Galp may refer to:

Galp Energia, an oil and gas company from Portugal
GalP (protein), an integral membrane protein present in Escherichia Coli
Glyceraldehyde 3-phosphate
Galanin-like peptide, a neuropeptide